Raimondas is a masculine Lithuanian given name. Notable people with the name include:

Raimondas Rumšas (born 1972), Lithuanian cyclist
Raimondas Vainoras (born 1965), Lithuanian footballer
Raimondas Vilčinskas (born 1977), Lithuanian cyclist
Raimondas Vilėniškis (born 1976), Lithuanian footballer
Raimondas Šiugždinis (born 1967), Lithuanian sailor
Raimondas Šukys (born 1966), Lithuanian lawyer and politician
Raimondas Žutautas (born 1972), Lithuanian footballer and manager

Lithuanian masculine given names